Dioryctria pinicolella is a species of snout moth in the genus Dioryctria. It was described by Hans Georg Amsel in 1962 and is known from Central America, including Mexico and Guatemala.

The wingspan is 27–32 mm. The forewings are grey with darker shading and two bright-gray zigzag
bands that cross the wing.

The larvae feed on Abies religiosa, Pinus cembroides, Pinus hartwegii, Pinus leiophylla, Pinus montezumae, Pinus oocarpa, Pinus radiata, Pinus rudis, Pseudotsuga macrolepis. The larvae bore through the scales, seeds and axis of cones of their host plant. They also infests rust cankers caused by Cronartium species. The larvae are dark pinkish brown, with a dark brown head. When fully grown they become greenish or purplish grey.

References

Moths described in 1962
pinicolella